This box set includes all songs from Black Sabbath's first six albums, excluding the songs without vocals.

Track listing
Disc 1
"Black Sabbath"
"The Wizard"
"Behind The Wall Of Sleep"
"N.I.B."
"Evil Woman"
"Sleeping Village"
"Warning"
"War Pigs"
"Paranoid"
"Planet Caravan"
"Iron Man"
"Hand Of Doom"
"Fairies Wear Boots"

Disc 2
"Electric Funeral"
"Sweet Leaf"
"After Forever"
"Embryo/Children Of The Grave"
"Lord Of This World"
"Solitude"
"Into The Void"
"Wheels Of Counfusion"
"Tomorrow's Dream"
"Changes"
"Supernaut"
"Snowblind"
"Cornucopia"
"St. Vitus Dance"
"Under The Sun"

Disc 3
"Sabbath Bloody Sabbath"
"A National Acrobat"
"Sabbra Cadabra"
"Killing Yourself To Live"
"Who Are You"
"Looking For Today"
"Spiral Architect"
"Hole In The Sky"
"Symptom Of The Universe"
"Am I Going Insane (Radio)"
"Thrill Of It All"
"Megalomania"
"The Writ"

Line up
Ozzy Osbourne - Vocals 
Tony Iommi - Guitar 
Geezer Butler - Bass 
Bill Ward - Drums

References

Black Sabbath compilation albums
1991 compilation albums
Castle Communications compilation albums
Teichiku Records albums
Albums produced by Patrick Meehan (producer)